The men's 3000 metres steeplechase at the 1946 European Athletics Championships was held in Oslo, Norway, at Bislett Stadium 25 August 1946.

Medalists

Results

Final
25 August

Participation
According to an unofficial count, 11 athletes from 8 countries participated in the event.

 (1)
 (2)
 (1)
 (1)
 (2)
 (1)
 (1)
 (2)

References

3000 metres steeplechase
Steeplechase at the European Athletics Championships